is a passenger railway station in located in the city of Hirakata, Osaka Prefecture, Japan, operated by West Japan Railway Company (JR West).

Lines

Station layout
The station has a single ground-level island platform with an elevated station building. The station has a Midori no Madoguchi staffed ticket office.

Platforms

Adjacent stations

History
The station was opened on 12 April 1898. 

Station numbering was introduced in March 2018 with Dojo being assigned station number JR-H27.

Passenger statistics
In fiscal 2019, the station was used by an average of 11,444 passengers daily (boarding passengers only).

Surrounding area
 Tomb of Wani
 Shoshun-ji Temple
 Sugawara Shrine
 Osaka Institute of Technology Hirakata Campus
 Osaka Prefectural Nagao High School

References

External links

 Official home page 

Railway stations in Japan opened in 1898
Railway stations in Osaka Prefecture
Hirakata, Osaka